In low-dimensional topology, a boundary-incompressible surface is a two-dimensional surface within a three-dimensional manifold whose topology cannot be made simpler by a certain type of operation known as boundary compression.

Suppose M is a 3-manifold with boundary. Suppose also that S is a compact surface with boundary that is properly embedded in M,
meaning that the boundary of S is a subset of the boundary of M and the interior points of S are a subset of the interior points of M.

Alternatively, one can relax this definition by dropping the requirement that the surface be properly embedded. Suppose now that S is a compact surface (with boundary) embedded in the boundary of a 3-manifold M.  Suppose further that D is a properly embedded disk in M such that D intersects S in an essential arc (one that does not cobound a disk in S with another arc in ).

See also 

 Incompressible surface

References 

 W. Jaco, Lectures on Three-Manifold Topology, volume 43 of CBMS Regional Conference Series in Mathematics. American Mathematical Society, Providence, R.I., 1980.
 T. Kobayashi, A construction of 3-manifolds whose homeomorphism classes of Heegaard splittings have polynomial growth, Osaka J. Math. 29 (1992), no. 4, 653–674.  .

Manifolds